Désiré is a French male given name, which means "desired, wished". The female form is Désirée. Désiré may refer to:

 Amable Courtecuisse (1823 - 1873), French baritone known simply as Désiré
 Désiré Bastin (1900–1972), Belgian football player
 Dési Bouterse (born 1945), Surinamese politician
 Désiré Charnay (1828–1915), French archaeologist
 Désiré Collen (born 1943), Belgian physician
 Désiré Dalloz (1795–1869), French jurist
 Désiré Defauw (1885–1960), Belgian conductor
 Désiré Dondeyne (1921-2015), French conductor
 Désiré Ferry (1886–1940), French politician
 Désiré Girouard (1836–1911), Canadian lawyer
 Désiré de Haerne (1804 - 1890), Signatory of the Belgian Constitution
 Désiré Keteleer (1920–1970), Belgian cyclist
 Désiré Koranyi (1914–1981), Hungarian-French football player
 Désiré Mbonabucya (born 1977), Rwandan football player
 Désiré Mérchez (1882–1968), French swimmer
 Désiré Munyaneza (born 1966), Rwandan war criminal
 Désiré Nisard (1806–1888), French author
 Désiré Olivier Bourbeau (1834–1900), Canadian politician
 Désiré Rakotoarijaona (born 1934), Prime Minister of Madagascar
 Désiré van Monckhoven (1834–1882), Belgian chemist
 Désiré Vervoort (1810–1886), Belgian lawyer

See also
 Constant-Désiré
 Désiré-Émile
 Désiré-Joseph
 Désiré-Lucas
 Désiré-Magloire
 François-Désiré
 Jacques-Désiré
 Jean-Désiré
 Joseph-Désiré
 Laurent-Désiré
 Louis-Désiré
 Saint-Désiré

References

French masculine given names